The I Street Bridge is a historic metal truss swing bridge which crosses the Sacramento River to link the capital city of Sacramento, California, with Yolo County to the west. It also carries two walkways; one on either side of the roadway.

The lower level of the bridge provides rail access to Sacramento from points south and west; the upper level provides highway access.

It was built to replace an 1867 timber Howe truss swing span bridge, which also carried both railroad and road traffic.

Gallery

See also
List of crossings of the Sacramento River

References

External links

I Street Bridge (added 1982 - Structure - #82002233) CA 16, Sacramento

NOAA NWS Advanced Hydrologic Prediction Service
I Street Bridge Replacement

Bridges over the Sacramento River
Bridges completed in 1911
Road bridges on the National Register of Historic Places in California
Railroad bridges on the National Register of Historic Places in California
Road-rail bridges in the United States
Buildings and structures in Sacramento, California
Transportation in Sacramento, California
Drawbridges on the National Register of Historic Places
Bridges in Sacramento County, California
Bridges in Yolo County, California
1911 establishments in California
National Register of Historic Places in Yolo County, California
National Register of Historic Places in Sacramento, California
Steel bridges in the United States
Union Pacific Railroad bridges